Frederick Josiah Grant (1905 – 1986) was a British Guiana-born jazz and calypso musician who played saxophone and clarinet.  Between the mid-1930s and mid-1950s he was active in Britain, before moving to the United States.

Biography
Grant was born in British Guiana.  He toured South America as a member of Vicente Gomez's band, before moving to Trinidad in 1933 where he joined the Trinidad Constabulary Band.  In 1937, he moved to England, and worked with several jazz and swing bands, including those led by Joe Appleton, Fela Sowande, Rudolph Dunbar, Johnny Claes, and Cyril Blake.  In 1942 he joined the Royal Air Force for two years, and on his discharge joined the bands led by Carlo Krahmer and Leslie "Jiver" Hutchinson.

Immediately after the end of the Second World War, in 1945, he featured with his own band, the West Indian Calypsonians, in concerts organised by record producer Denis Preston, sometimes being billed as "Frederico and the Calypsonians", "Freddy Grant's Demerarians", or "Freddy's Calypso Serenaders".  He played again with Appleton, and with Kenny Graham's Afro-Cubists, before joining forces with Humphrey Lyttelton in 1952 and recording with him for Parlophone Records as the Grant-Lyttelton Paseo Jazz Band.  Promoted by Preston, the band toured with singers Young Tiger and Bill Rogers.  Grant recorded with calypso star Lord Kitchener, and worked in other bands and in nightclubs in London.  He also appeared on such BBC radio programmes as London Jazz and Calling the West Indies.

In 1953, he moved to the US, where he was credited as Sir Freddy Grant and led his own calypso band. He appeared at Carnegie Hall in 1955, and in 1957 recorded the album Calypso for Bethlehem Records.

Grant died in Westchester, New York, in 1986.

References

1905 births
1986 deaths
British Guiana people
Jazz saxophonists
Calypsonians
20th-century saxophonists
Guyanese expatriates in the United Kingdom
Guyanese emigrants to the United States